Sergey Semenov (born January 4, 1985) is a Ukrainian footballer who plays in the Ontario Soccer League with FC Ukraine United.

Playing career 
Semenov began his career with SC Tavriya Simferopol in 2004 in the Vyshcha Liha Reserves, appearing in 18 matches and recording 1 goal. The following season he played in the Ukrainian Second League with MFC Zhytomyr, and played with NAPCS-Dynamo Simferopol in 2006. In 2016, he went abroad to play with FC Ukraine United in the Canadian Soccer League. In his second season he assisted FC Ukraine in achieving a perfect season, and winning the Second Division Championship. He played in the Ontario Soccer League in 2021 with Ukraine United.

References 

1985 births
Living people
Ukrainian footballers
Ukrainian expatriate footballers
FC Ukraine United players
Canadian Soccer League (1998–present) players
Association football midfielders
Ukrainian Premier League players
Ukrainian Second League players
Sportspeople from Kherson Oblast